Steve Trimble (May 11, 1958 – July 11, 2011) was an American football defensive back in the National Football League (NFL), the United States Football League (USFL), and the Arena Football League (AFL).  He played college football at Maryland, and high school at Fort Hill in Cumberland, Maryland.

Trimble was the head coach of Bishop Denis J. O'Connell High School in Arlington, Virginia from 2002 through 2010. He also coached in the NFL, Arena Football League, and college football.

Trimble died of a heart attack at O'Connell High School on July 11, 2011.

Personal life
Trimble is survived on by his daughter, four sons, and wife Gretchen.

References

External links
 

1958 births
2011 deaths
American football defensive backs
Chicago Bears players
Denver Broncos players
Denver Dynamite (arena football) players
Denver Gold players
Detroit Drive players
Maryland Terrapins football players
National Football League replacement players
New Orleans Saints coaches
New York Jets coaches
High school football coaches in Virginia
Sportspeople from Cumberland, Maryland
Players of American football from Maryland
African-American coaches of American football
African-American players of American football
20th-century African-American sportspeople
21st-century African-American people